The SAPI-1 was a computer produced in the former Czechoslovakia by Tesla since 1980.

It was designed by Eduard Smutný (hardware) and his brother Tomáš Smutný (software), and based on the Intel 8080/2 MHz clone (and later Z80). The SAPI-86 was also developed as an 8086 clone of the PC.

The SAPI-1 had a modular construction with modules:

JPR-1 - processor board based on MHB 8080 processor, 1 KB SRAM, 4 KB ROM modules and 6 IO ports
JPR-1Z - processor board based on Z80 processor
ARB-1 - bus unit
JZS-1 - power supply with rack
ANK-1 - non smart, no ergonomic membrane keyboard (comparable with Sinclair ZX-80 and ZX-81)
REM-1 - extension board with EPROM and SRAM modules
AND-1 - alfanumeric video adapter, 40 columns x 24 rows, black and white with 2 KBytes of video buffer at 3800
AND-1A - alfanumeric video adapter, 40 columns x 24 rows, black and white with 2 KBytes of video buffer at E800
RAM-1 - board of 32 KB of dynamic RAM
DSM-1 - modem and serial interface (based on MHB 1012 UART) used to communication with tape recorder
BDK-1 - universal developer board
DPP-1 - parallel port board (based on two MHB 8255 chips)
DGD-1 - B/W graphic video adapter - requires second monitor, cannot output to monitor connected to AND-1
RPD-1 - floppy disk controller, due to its complexity (discrete glue logic) was built on two boards connected by cable. This came very late.

3 versions of SAPI-1 were produced:
SAPI-1 ZPS 1 (základní průmyslová sestava - basic industrial set):
integer Micro-Basic was stored in ROM, as well as simple machine code monitor, tape was used as main storage device, using single block recording.
SAPI-1 ZPS 2:
MIKOS (mikro kazetový operační systém - micro cassette operating system) with better machine code monitor was stored in ROM, any other programming language was loaded from tape, using blocks of 255 data bytes.
SAPI-1 ZPS 3:
ROM contains CP/M booting sequence, CP/M is booting from 8" Shugart floppy disk drives. Position of VideoRAM was moved from 3800 to E800 to allow CP/M running.
The "Z" version of SAPI-1 ZPS 3 used Z80 processor clone instead of 8080 clone, video with 64 characters per line instead of 40.

References

Mycro-1
Science and technology in Czechoslovakia